Laurence S. Baskin is a professor of pediatrics and chief of pediatric urology at University of California, San Francisco (UCSF). His specialty is pediatric urologic reconstruction and the urologic care of  patients with myelomeningocele.

Research
The focus of his research is on development of the urinary bladder, including the role of cellular signaling, and on normal and abnormal genital development with respect to their possible endocrine origin.

Publications
 Handbook of Pediatric Urology, Laurence S. Baskin and Barry A. Kogan, Editors (2005)
 Hypospadias and Genital Development, Volume 545 (2004)

External links
 Webpage at UCSF

References

Living people
University of California, San Francisco faculty
Healthcare in the San Francisco Bay Area
American urologists
Year of birth missing (living people)